The Port of Plaquemines is one of the largest seaports in the United States.  It is located at the mouth of the Mississippi River on the Gulf of Mexico, near  Belle Chasse in Plaquemines Parish, Louisiana, about twenty miles south of New Orleans.

The Plaquemines Port, Harbor & Terminal District is coextensive with Plaquemines Parish, and was created in 1954 by the legislature of Louisiana as a state agency.  It is governed by a committee of the Plaquemines Parish Council, acting as the Port Board.

In 2008, Plaquemines handled a total of 63.7 million tons of shipping, of which 35.8 million tons was domestic trade.

References
Notes

External links 
 Official website
 Data page at World Port Source

Ports and harbors of Louisiana
Transportation in New Orleans
Economy of Louisiana
River ports of the United States
Buildings and structures in Plaquemines Parish, Louisiana
Transportation in Plaquemines Parish, Louisiana